Suresh Kumar Mishra is a former Indian volleyball team captain in Asian Games held at Bangkok in 1978. He belongs from Laxmangarh, Sikar, Rajasthan. He was born in Laxmangarh on 25 September 1953. He was awarded the Arjuna Award in 1979 by the Government of India for his achievements. After winning the Arjuna award, he was the coach of Abu Dhabi police volleyball team from 1980 to 1995.

References

Recipients of the Arjuna Award
Living people
1953 births
Rajasthani people
Indian men's volleyball players
Volleyball players from Rajasthan
Volleyball players at the 1974 Asian Games
Volleyball players at the 1978 Asian Games
Asian Games competitors for India